Felix Jacob Burestedt (born 26 February 1995) is a Swedish badminton player. Trained at the Halmstad BMK, Burestedt made his international debut in 2013, and entered the Badminton Europe Centre of Excellence (CoE) in 2017. He won his first international title at the 2018 Lithuanian International in the men's singles event. He competed at the 2019 European Games, and also at the 2020 Summer Olympics.

Achievements

BWF International Challenge/Series (2 titles, 3 runners-up) 
Men's singles

  BWF International Challenge tournament
  BWF International Series tournament
  BWF Future Series tournament

References

External links 
 

1995 births
Living people
People from Ängelholm Municipality
Swedish male badminton players
Badminton players at the 2020 Summer Olympics
Olympic badminton players of Sweden
Badminton players at the 2019 European Games
European Games competitors for Sweden
Sportspeople from Skåne County
21st-century Swedish people